The Taferlklaussee was created in 1716 by the damming of the Aurach Creek. The lake can be reached on foot by a 3.5-hour hike from the village of Altmünster in Upper Austria.

The lake's clear water is of drinking water quality. In winter, the lake is used for skating and curling.

Lakes of Upper Austria